Njikoka is a Local Government Area in Anambra State, south-east Nigeria. Towns that make up the local government include Abagana, Enugwu-Agidi, Enugwu-ukwu, Nawfia, Nimo, Abba town, and Umuriam-Nawfia.

Schools
Here is the list of secondary schools in Njikoka Local Government Area:
 Community Secondary School, Nawfia
 Girls Secondary School, Abagana
 Nnamdi Azikiwe Secondary School, Abagana
 Ide Girls’ Secondary School, Enugwu Ukwu
 St. Michael's Model Comprehensive Secondary School, Nimo
 Girls Secondary School, Nimo
 St. Joseph Girls Secondary School, Nimo
 Community Secondary School, Abba
 Government Technical College, Enugwu Agidi
 Girls Secondary School, Enugwu Agidi
 Okutalukwe Community Secondary School, Enugwu-Ukwu
 Comprehensive secondary school, Nawfia
 Community secondary School, Nawfia
 busy international secondary school nimo[By Ndiukwu smart2010]
 Stella Marris Secondary School, Abagana

Hotels and Relaxation spot
Chrispan Hotels, Abagana
Jaspino Hotels Enugwu-ukwu
Patriots Summit Hotels Enugwu-ukwu
Capital plaza Hotel Enugwu-ukwu
Jollyland Hotel Nawfia
Peace Joint Enuagu Enugwu-ukwu
Oguno's Castel villa Enuagu Enugwu-ukwu
Obu OforNri Museum Enugwu_ukwu
Anti nature venue spot Umuatulu Ifite ani
Mayor Motels, Abagana.

References
LOCAL GOVERNMENT AREAS IN ANAMBRA STATE dated July 21, 2007; accessed October 4, 2007

Local Government Areas in Anambra State
Local Government Areas in Igboland